Sthlm ("Stockholm") is a Swedish 6-part TV series from 2008, written and directed by Håkan Lindhé.

Part 1 (Johan)
Plot: Johan has trouble with his mentally ill mother who thinks she is a member of the royalty. He tries to get free from her, which turns out not to be easy.
 Erik Johansson - Johan
 Eva Fritjofsson - Mother Louise
 Eva Röse - Elin
 Andreas Nilsson - P-G, human resources director at Elgiganten
 Svetlana Rodina-Ljungkvist - Dr. Bogren
 Jens Hultén - Nurse
 Nicklas Gustavsson - Security guard
 Christian Wennberg - Customer at Elgiganten

Part 2 (Farouk)
Plot: Farouk is a bored taxi driver, but when a pregnant woman has to be taken to a hospital, he has greater responsibility than a taxi driver normally should, as the woman is mentally ill and wants to get rid of her new-born baby.
 Michalis Koutsogiannakis - Farouk
 Johanna Wilson - Johanna, the pregnant woman
 Björn Bengtsson - Claes
 Susan Taslimi - Farouk's wife
 Sannamari Patjas - Midwife

Part 3 (Adam)
Plot: Adam is a nine-year-old lonely child with rather irresponsible parents. When his father fetches him from school on a Friday afternoon he has alternative plans for the weekend: to travel on a luxury boat with his friend and party, and Adam is coming with him.
 Kristoffer Stålfors - Adam
 Peter Engman - Micke, Adam's father
 Mattias Silvell - Kricke
 Helena af Sandeberg - Isabel
 Linda Santiago - Adam's mother
 Claudia Galli - Adam's teacher

2008 Swedish television series debuts
2000s Swedish television series
2008 Swedish television series endings